Gothic is a Unicode block containing characters for writing the East Germanic Gothic language.

History
The following Unicode-related documents record the purpose and process of defining specific characters in the Gothic block:

References 

Unicode blocks
Gothic writing